Forever, for Always, for Luther Volume II, released on November 21, 2006 by Rendezvous Entertainment, is a smooth jazz various artists tribute album, with ten popular songs written by Luther Vandross. The album was produced by Rex Rideout and Bud Harner, as a follow-up to their earlier GRP Records tribute album, Forever, For Always, For Luther.

Rideout had co-authored songs and contributed arrangements and played keyboards on Luther's final three albums.

Saxophonist Dave Koz, who had performed on the first album, and who had founded Rendezvous Entertainment a few years earlier, released the 2006 follow-up on his own Rendezvous label. Dave Koz played on all the featured Luther Vandross tracks, which were recorded by various smooth jazz artists.

Track listing

 Give Me the Reason, Kirk Whalum, 4:03 
 'Til My Baby Comes Home,  Norman Brown and Everette Harp, 5:29 
 There's Nothing Better Than Love, Maysa and Kevin Whalum, 5:53 
 For You to Love, Jeff Lorber, 5:20 
 If This World Were Mine, Gerald Albright, 5:15 
 The Glow of Love, Wayman Tisdale, 4:03 
 So Amazing, Patti Austin, 4:26 
 The Night I Fell in Love, Najee, 4:39 
 I Don't Want to Be a Fool, Jonathan Butler, 5:06 
 Superstar, Will Downing, 5:48

References

Luther Vandross tribute albums
2006 compilation albums
Smooth jazz compilation albums
GRP Records compilation albums